"Hometown Glory" is the debut single by English singer-songwriter Adele, released on 22 October 2007 in the United Kingdom. The song appears on her debut studio album 19 (2008). In 2008, the song was re-released as her fourth single. Adele wrote the song within 10 minutes, when she was only 16 years old, after her mother tried to persuade her to leave her home suburb of West Norwood in London for university. "Hometown Glory" is the first song that Adele ever wrote.

In 2007, "Hometown Glory" was released on singer Jamie T's Pacemaker Recordings label as a limited edition 7" vinyl single, of which only 500 copies were made. The song failed to chart initially. However, due to high downloads of the song during the release week of Adele's 19, the song managed to chart inside the UK Singles Chart top 40 for the first time. At the 52nd Annual Grammy Awards, the song received a nomination for Best Female Pop Vocal Performance.

Background and composition
"Hometown Glory" was re-released on 21 July 2008 as the follow-up to second single "Cold Shoulder". The song was added to Radio 1's B-list on 18 June 2008, and moved up to Radio 1's A-list on 2 July 2008. Its B-side now featured Adele's brand-new cover of the Etta James song "Fool That I Am", which was recorded during a live performance in Cambridge. The song was later released in 2008 as Adele's debut single for the US market. Due to its popularity in the UK, which resulted in it charting inside the top 40 twice on download sales alone, it was re-released as the third single (fourth including the original single release) from the album on 21 July 2008. As of July 2008, the song has become Adele's third consecutive top 20 hit single.

The song is played in the key of B♭ minor with an intro at a tempo of 60 beats per minute, before changing to 124 beats per minute. Adele's vocal range is D♭–A.  "Hometown Glory" follows the chord progression Bm(i) – D/A(III) – D/F(III) – G/B(VI M7).

Chart performance
On 13 April 2008, the song entered the UK Singles Chart at No. 32, following its showcase on an episode of the British television show Skins. On 6 July 2008, "Hometown Glory" re-entered the chart at No. 74 and then climbed to No. 49 the following week. It eventually peaked at No. 19 on 27 July 2008, following its physical release.

Accolades
"Hometown Glory" received a nomination at the 52nd Grammy Awards in the Best Female Pop Vocal Performance category but lost out to Beyoncé's "Halo".

Music video 
The initial limited edition vinyl release of "Hometown Glory" does not have a promo video. In June 2008, XL released a Paul Dugdale-directed live video for the single's re-release. In April 2009, Columbia finally released a proper promo video directed by Rocky Schenck and filmed at Sony Pictures Studios on Stage 29. The video shows Adele singing while backdrops of American cities are moved around her. As of October 2021, the music video has received over 114 million views on YouTube.

In the media
On 7 April 2008, "Hometown Glory" was featured in the critically acclaimed, British teen drama series Skins, resulting in the song re-entering the UK Singles Chart top 40 at No. 32. Later that month, on 24 April 2008, the song was featured in episode 5.15 of the American TV drama One Tree Hill. On 22 May 2008, the song was featured in the season four finale of US TV series Grey's Anatomy. According to Adele's manager Jonathan Dickins, the powerful music supervisor Alexandra Patsavas chose the song after seeing Adele perform it at the Hotel Café in Los Angeles, following a recommendation by Columbia Records' creative licensing staffer Jonathan Palmer. On 10 June 2008, the song was used on popular UK soap Hollyoaks, where it has been used again on 13 October 2008 episode. It was used again on Hollyoaks on the 10 November 2010 episode which featured the death of one of the UK's most popular television characters Steph Cunningham. The opening of the song played as Steph said goodbye to her on-screen husband Gilly Roach, choosing to perish in a house fire rather than face death from the cervical cancer doctors had informed her was terminal. The episode was a season-high for Hollyoaks, viewed by 2.12 million viewers (including timeshift and E4 figures, 0.7, a high for the channel) – a high figure for a non-BBC or ITV show.

On 2 July 2008, it was featured on season four of So You Think You Can Dance in a Mia Michaels' contemporary dance by Katee Shean and eventual winner, Joshua Allen. It also featured in a season two episode of Secret Diary of a Call Girl. A remixed version of the song was featured in the superhero drama-comedy Misfits. The track has also been used on advertisements and promotional scenes for the UK soap Coronation Street. The song was featured in a season one episode of the American teen drama series 90210. It was also featured on the reality TV show The Hills.

"Hometown Glory" has also been sampled by other artists, including by the Mississippi rapper Big K.R.I.T. on his single "Hometown Hero", in Big Sean's song "Hometown" from his mixtape Finally Famous Vol. 3: BIG, by French rapper La Fouine on his song "Vecu" featuring French rapper Kamelancien, by The OCS on his song "Hometown" featuring Glasses Malone, Jay Rock and XO, by the Montreal rapper Boy6lue in his song "Hometown" featuring Two Two and by Minneapolis hippy-hop artist Mod Sun on his song "The Same Way".

Adele's song has been used in various soap operas in accompaniment to the deaths of Danielle Jones, Steph Roach, Joe McIntyre, Archie Mitchell, and Bradley Branning. It has also been used in EastEnders: Revealed. Various reality singing and talent shows use the song in between performances such as The X Factor in the United Kingdom and in Australia, Britain's Got Talent, and Australia's Got Talent. The song was used memorably at the end of Julien Temple's 2012 documentary, London: The Modern Babylon, which debuted on BBC in August 2012 to coincide with the end of the Olympic Games and takes its place in the film alongside other London anthems including "London Calling" by The Clash and "Waterloo Sunset" by The Kinks.

During the free skate of both the pairs and team events at the 2018 Winter Olympics, Canadians Meagan Duhamel and Eric Radford skated to the song. "Hometown Glory" was also their winning free performance at the 2016 World Figure Skating Championships.

On the 30 September 2020, the song was used during the final moments of the BBC series Ambulance.

Formats and track listings

Original release
7-inch vinyl
"Hometown Glory"
"Best for Last"

Re-release
CD single
"Hometown Glory" – 4:32
"Fool That I Am"  – 3:45

Digital EP
"Hometown Glory" – 3:40
"Hometown Glory"  – 3:35
"Hometown Glory"  – 5:11
"Hometown Glory"  – 5:55
"Hometown Glory"  – 6:36
"Hometown Glory"  – 6:35

7-inch vinyl
"Hometown Glory" – 4:32
"Fool That I Am"  – 3:45

12-inch vinyl
"Hometown Glory" 
"Hometown Glory"

Official remixes
 Album Version
 Single Version
 Radio Edit 
 High Contrast Remix
 Axwell Remix
 Axwell Remode Mix
 Axwell Radio Edit

Charts

Weekly charts

Year-end charts

Certifications

References

2007 debut singles
2007 songs
Adele songs
Music videos directed by Rocky Schenck
Song recordings produced by Jim Abbiss
Songs about London
Songs written by Adele
XL Recordings singles